This is a list of people elected Fellow of the Royal Society in 1959.

Royal Fellow 
Gustaf VI Adolf of Sweden

Fellows 
Geoffrey Herbert Beale
Franz Bergel
Ann Bishop
Geoffrey Emett Blackman
Sir Hermann Bondi
James Macdonald Cassels
Arthur Roy Clapham
Francis Harry Compton Crick
Geoffrey Bertram Robert Feilden
Raymond James Wood Le Fevre
David Willis Wilson Henderson
Richard Darwin Keynes
Bernhard Hermann Neumann
Stephen Robert Nockolds
William Charles Price
Geoffrey Vincent Raynor
Sir Rex Edward Richards
Owain Westmacott Richards
Claude Ambrose Rogers
Muhammad Abdus Salam
Robert Spence
Sylvia Agnes Sophia Tait
James Francis Tait
Maurice Hugh Frederick Wilkins
Sidney William Wooldridge

Foreign members
Melvin Calvin
Gerhard Domagk
Jan Hendrik Oort
Axel Hugo Theodor Theorell

1959
1959 in science
1959 in the United Kingdom